This is a list of all tornadoes that were confirmed by local offices of the National Weather Service in the United States in June 2011.

United States yearly total

June

June 1 event

June 3 event

June 6 event

June 7 event

June 8 event

June 9 event

June 10 event

June 11 event

June 12 event

June 13 event

June 14 event

June 15 event

June 16 event

June 17 event

June 18 event

June 19 event

June 20 event

June 21 event

June 22 event

June 23 event

June 24 event

June 25 event

June 26 event

June 27 event

June 29 event

June 30 event

See also
 Tornadoes of 2011

References

United States,06
Tornadoes,2011,06
2011,06
Tornadoes